Rex Jesse Hunsaker (December 13, 1909 – March 20, 1994) was an American football coach and athletic administrator. He was the head football coach at Oregon Institute of Technology from 1950 to 1951 and the school's athletic director from 1953 to 1962. He also held multiple high school coaching positions in Utah, Idaho, and Oregon.

Early years
Hunsaker was born in Honeyville, Utah, in 1909. He attended Utah State University where he earned varsity letters in football and basketball. He graduated from Utah State in 1936. He then attended graduate school at the University of Idaho.

Coaching career
Hunsaker began his career as a high school basketball and football coach in Utah and Idaho. He held positions in southern Utah, Inkom, Idaho, and Downey, Idaho. He then coached at Buhl High School in Buhl, Idaho, and Rupert High School in Rupert, Idaho.

After World War II, Hunsaker coached at Albany High School in Albany, Oregon. He served as athletic director, football coach, and baseball coach at Albany. He was Albany's head football coach from 1945 to 1949, compiling a 27–13–8 record, including a 9–1 record in 1948.

Hunsaker was hired in April 1950 as head football coach at Oregon Institute of Technology (Oregon Tech) in Klamath Falls, Oregon. He led the Oregon Tech football team from 1950 to 1961, compiling a record of 60–44–6 and leading the 1960 team to an undefeated season. He also served as the athletic director at Oregon Tech from 1953 to 1962. Prior to his hiring, Oregon Tech had never won a championship in any sport. During his tenure as athletic director, Oregon Tech won a championship in every major sport except baseball.

Family and later years
Hunsaker married Viola Hammond in 1939 in Logan, Utah.

In May 1962, Hunsaker resigned his post at Oregon Tech to become principal at Lakeview High School in Lakeview, Oregon.

Hunsaker died in 1994 in Pleasanton, California. He was buried at Lincoln Memorial Park in Portland, Oregon.

Head coaching record

College football

Notes

References

External links
 

1909 births
1994 deaths
American school principals
Oregon Tech Hustlin' Owls athletic directors
Oregon Tech Hustlin' Owls football coaches
Utah State Aggies football players
Utah State Aggies men's basketball players
College golf coaches in the United States
High school baseball coaches in the United States
High school basketball coaches in Idaho
High school basketball coaches in Utah
High school football coaches in Idaho
High school football coaches in Oregon
High school football coaches in Utah
University of Idaho alumni
People from Box Elder County, Utah
Coaches of American football from Utah
Players of American football from Utah
Baseball coaches from Utah
Basketball coaches from Utah
Basketball players from Utah
Latter Day Saints from Utah